Typhlodaphne platamodes is a species of sea snail, a marine gastropod mollusk in the family Borsoniidae.

Description

Distribution
This species occurs in the Southern Indian Ocean off the Kerguelen Islands and Crozet Island.

References

 R. Boog Watson, 1886. Report on the Scaphopoda and Gasteropoda collected by HMS Challenger during the years 1873-1876. Reports of the scientific results of the voyage of H.M.S. "Challenger"

platamodes
Gastropods described in 1881